Deroua is a town in Berrechid Province, Casablanca-Settat, Morocco. It lies to the south of Casablanca, just to the northeast of Mohamed V International Airport. According to the 2014 Moroccan census it recorded a population of 47,719, up from 10,373 in the 2004 census.

Climate 
Deroua has a hot-summer Mediterranean climate (Köppen climate classification Csa).

References

Populated places in Berrechid Province
Municipalities of Morocco